The Democratic and Radical Union (Union démocratique et radicale) was a French parliamentary group in the French Senate during the French Third Republic. The Democratic and Radical Union was formed by members of the Independent Radicals and other Radical Senators who did not join or left the Radical-Socialist Party.

The group disappeared in 1940 and was not re-created post-war. Most members joined the post-war PRI or the RGR.

See also 
Radical Party (France)
Independent Radicals
Sinistrisme

Defunct political parties in France
Political parties of the French Third Republic
Parliamentary groups in France